Jevon is a given name. Notable people with the name include:

Jevon Atkinson, swimmer
Jevon Carter (born 1995), American basketball player
Jevon Crudup, basketball player
Jevon Demming (born 1989), football player
Jevon Groves, rugby union player
Jevon Holland (born 2000), Canadian-American football player
Jevon Jones (born 1973), American rapper
Jevon Kearse (born 1976), football player
Jevon Langford (born 1974), football player
Jevon Tarantino (born 1984), springboard diver

Notable people with the surname include:
Rachel Jevon (bapt. 1627), English poet
Thomas Jevon (1652–1688), English playwright

See also
Jevan Snead (born 1987), football player
Javon, given name 
Jevons